William Godsell Wright (13 March 1904  4 August 1973) was an Episcopal prelate who served as Bishop of Nevada from 1960 to 1972.

Education
Wright was born on March 13, 1904, in Greenville, Illinois, the son of William Clifford Wright and Edith Browning. He graduated with a bachelor's degree from the University of Illinois and later from the General Theological Seminary with a Bachelor of Sacred Theology. After ordination, he served as rector of St Paul's Church in Cleveland Heights, Ohio and later as rector of St Clement's Church in El Paso, Texas. In 1953, he also became the director of the National Council's Home Department.

In 1959 Wright was elected missionary Bishop of Nevada. He was consecrated on  February 4, 1960, by presiding Bishop Arthur C. Lichtenberger in Trinity Church in Reno, Nevada. During his time in Nevada, four new Episcopal churches were established in the state. He retired by the end of 1971.

References 

1904 births
1973 deaths
20th-century Anglican bishops in the United States
Episcopal bishops of Nevada